Sergei Aleksandrovich Pavlov (born 16 September 1955) is a Russian professional football coach.

Career

Managerial
In April 2017, Pavlov was appointed as manager of FC Atyrau following the resignation of Zoran Vulić. Pavlov himself then resigned on 21 September 2017.

Honours
 Russian First Division best manager: 2005.

References

External links
 

1955 births
Living people
People from Kamyshin
Russian football managers
FC Tekstilshchik Kamyshin managers
FC Saturn Ramenskoye managers
FC Elista managers
FC Chernomorets Novorossiysk managers
FC Luch Vladivostok managers
FC Kuban Krasnodar managers
FC Shinnik Yaroslavl managers
FC Torpedo Moscow managers
FC Arsenal Tula managers
Russian Premier League managers
FC Rotor Volgograd managers
FC Atyrau managers
Russian expatriate football managers
Expatriate football managers in Kazakhstan
Sportspeople from Volgograd Oblast